Gaston Briese (19 August 1898 – 22 March 1953) was a German stage and film actor. He appeared in more than forty films during his career, which spanned from the late silent era to the mid-1940s. His final appearance was in the 1946 rubble film Somewhere in Berlin.

Selected filmography
 The Pink Slippers (1927)
 Always Be True and Faithful (1927)
 Gentlemen Among Themselves (1929)
 Distinguishing Features (1929)
 The Love Market (1930)
 Wibbel the Tailor (1931)
 Without Meyer, No Celebration is Complete (1931)
 Terror of the Garrison (1931)
 Bashful Felix (1934)
 The Bird Seller (1935)
 Trouble Backstairs (1935)
 The Dreamer (1936)
 Paul and Pauline (1936)
 Orders Are Orders (1936)
 Hilde and the Volkswagen (1936)
 Red Orchids (1938)
 Somewhere in Berlin (1946)
 Falstaff in Vienna (1940)

References

Bibliography 
 Shandley, Robert. Rubble Films: German Cinema in the Shadow of the Third Reich. Temple University Press, 2010.

External links 
 

1898 births
1953 deaths
German male stage actors
German male film actors
Male actors from Berlin
20th-century German male actors